Tomchi  is a 2021 Bollywood children film directed by Rajesh Gupta under the banner of Tulsi Production in association with Star Buzz, starring Yashpal Sharma, Vrajesh Hirjee, Rati Agnihotri, Mahesh Thakur, Narendra Bedi, Upasana Singh, Kurush Deboo, Sheetal Shah, Swati Aggarwal and child artists Faiza Thakur, Azaan Shah, Rohit Kumar Sharma (As= Rohit Kumar), Yana Mistry, Azaan Khan, Adeeb Hussain, Alam Khan, Haitvi Parek. The music was composed by Anand Raj Anand, with guest composer Ritesh Bhoyar and lyrics by Narendra Bedi, Ritesh Bhoyar, Akhilesh, Manoj and background music by Puneet Dixit.

Filming

Shooting of the film started at the end of November 2018, in Jaipur. It was also shot on various location in Surat and Mumbai. Special guest appearances were shot with actress Madhoo at S.J. Studio Mumbai.

References

External links 
  Sify news 
 Times of India
  Hindustan Times

2012 films
Indian children's films
2010s Hindi-language films
2010s children's films